The Fundació Miró Mallorca (Miró Mallorca Foundation) is a museum in Palma de Mallorca, dedicated to the work of the artist Joan Miró.  It comprises a main building exhibiting 6000 works donated by the artist, including paintings and sculptures, a library, a sculpture garden, Miró's studio Sert, and the Finca Son Boter.

Miró's mother and wife were from Majorca. He settled on the island in 1956. The studio Sert was designed for Miró by Josep Lluís Sert in the same year and was used by the artist until his death in 1983. In 1959 Miró bought the nearby Finca Son Boter which he also used as an atelier; his graffiti on the walls can still be seen. The foundation was created in 1981 by Joan Miró and his wife Pilar Juncosa. The museum, designed by Rafael Moneo, was built in 1992.

See also
 List of single-artist museums
 Fundació Joan Miró, Barcelona

External links
 Fundació Miró Mallorca Official Website
 

Biographical museums in Spain
Museums in the Balearic Islands
Joan Miró
Miro